St Columba Church, Glasgow may refer to:

 St Columba's Catholic Church, Glasgow in Woodside, Glasgow
 St Columba Church of Scotland, Glasgow on Vincent Street, Glasgow

See also
 St. Columba's Church (disambiguation)